In mathematics, a superparticular ratio, also called a superparticular number or epimoric ratio, is the ratio of two consecutive integer numbers.

More particularly, the ratio takes the form:
  where  is a positive integer.

Thus:

Superparticular ratios were written about by Nicomachus in his treatise Introduction to Arithmetic.  Although these numbers have applications in modern pure mathematics, the areas of study that most frequently refer to the superparticular ratios by this name are music theory and the history of mathematics.

Mathematical properties
As Leonhard Euler observed, the superparticular numbers (including also the multiply superparticular ratios, numbers formed by adding an integer other than one to a unit fraction) are exactly the rational numbers whose continued fraction terminates after two terms. The numbers whose continued fraction terminates in one term are the integers, while the remaining numbers, with three or more terms in their continued fractions, are superpartient.

The Wallis product
 
represents the irrational number  in several ways as a product of superparticular ratios and their inverses. It is also possible to convert the Leibniz formula for π into an Euler product of superparticular ratios in which each term has a prime number as its numerator and the nearest multiple of four as its denominator:

In graph theory, superparticular numbers (or rather, their reciprocals, 1/2, 2/3, 3/4, etc.) arise via the Erdős–Stone theorem as the possible values of the upper density of an infinite graph.

Other applications
In the study of harmony, many musical intervals can be expressed as a superparticular ratio (for example, due to octave equivalency, the ninth harmonic, 9/1, may be expressed as a superparticular ratio, 9/8). Indeed, whether a ratio was superparticular was the most important criterion in Ptolemy's formulation of musical harmony. In this application, Størmer's theorem can be used to list all possible superparticular numbers for a given limit; that is, all ratios of this type in which both the numerator and denominator are smooth numbers.

These ratios are also important in visual harmony.  Aspect ratios of 4:3 and 3:2 are common in digital photography, and aspect ratios of 7:6 and 5:4 are used in medium format and large format photography respectively.

Ratio names and related intervals
Every pair of adjacent positive integers represent a superparticular ratio, and similarly every pair of adjacent harmonics in the harmonic series (music) represent a superparticular ratio. Many individual superparticular ratios have their own names, either in historical mathematics or in music theory. These include the following:

The root of some of these terms comes from Latin sesqui- "one and a half" (from semis "a half" and -que "and") describing the ratio 3:2.

Notes

Citations

External links
 Superparticular numbers applied to construct pentatonic scales by David Canright.
 De Institutione Arithmetica, liber II by Anicius Manlius Severinus Boethius

Rational numbers